Zarky is a surname. Notable people with the surname include:

Hilbert Philip Zarky (1912–1989), American tax attorney
Norma Zarky (1917–1977), American lawyer, wife of Hilbert

See also
 Zark (disambiguation)
 Zarki
 Žarko